Jeff Caster (11 August 1958 - 3 January 2015) is an American film and television actor. He has appeared in many films and television series in both Europe and Australia. His film appearances include in Running Scared (2006), and his noteworthy TV appearances are in Frank Herbert's Dune (2000), Anne Frank: The Whole Story (2001) and Death Row (2001).

Caster has lived in Germany since 1995. He has founded two actors groups in Germany: The Re-Actors Studio, and Hamburg's English Alternative Theater (H.E.A.T.). He is the son of John and Marjorie Caster. He is married to Kathleen Caster and they have two children.

Filmography

References

External links
 Jeff Caster's website

1958 births
Living people
American male film actors
Male actors from Kansas City, Missouri
American male television actors
American expatriates in Germany